Hannah Xue Jia Dederick (born Xua Jia on 20 November 2002) is an American Paralympic athlete of Chinese descent who competes in sprinting events in international level events.

Early life
Dederick was abandoned at a city hospital's steps in Suzhou as a baby before being adopted to an orphanage. She was adopted by a volunteer at the orphanage who took her to Oxford, Alabama in 2006. After living there for almost 4 years, she then moved with her family to Spokane, Washington in 2012 . When she was brought to the United States for the first time, her adopted family and the orphanage's volunteers were able to raise funds to enable Dederick to have corrective surgery to fix her spina bifida.

References

2002 births
Living people
American people of Chinese descent
Paralympic track and field athletes of the United States
American female wheelchair racers
Medalists at the 2019 Parapan American Games
Athletes (track and field) at the 2020 Summer Paralympics
Sportspeople from Spokane, Washington
Sportspeople from Suzhou
21st-century American women